Narayana Multispeciality Hospital (formerly known as Westbank Hospital), sister hospital of Narayana Superspeciality Hospital, Howrah, is a multi-speciality hospital of Narayana Health on Andul road,  Howrah, West Bengal. Its proximity to Kolkata makes it accessible to patients from the metropolis. The hospital has 150 beds in unit 1 and 250 beds in unit 2.

The hospital was a subsidiary of Meridian Medical Research & Hospital Limited (MMRHL), a public limited company, which was acquired by the Narayana Health group, headed by renowned cardiac surgeon  Dr. Devi Prasad Shetty in 2014. The hospital was initially operated by MMRHL for 15 years.

External links
Official Website

References

Hospitals in Kolkata
Hospitals in West Bengal
Hospitals in India
Narayana Health